The 1920 Tulane Green Wave football team represented the Tulane Green Wave of the Tulane University during the 1920 Southern Intercollegiate Athletic Association football season.  The 1920 team tied for the SIAA championship with Georgia and Georgia Tech, and was the first called the "Green Wave", after a song titled "The Rolling Green Wave".

Before the season
In the prior year of 1919, coach Clark Shaughnessy guided Tulane to a then-school record of seven consecutive wins, and had transformed Tulane into a competitor among Southern collegiate teams.

Though he was famous for later using the T formation, at Tulane Shaughnessy employed the single wing.  Shaughnessy also introduced to Tulane the Minnesota shift, an innovation created by his former coach Henry L. Williams.

Germany Schulz was hired to take over duties as athletic director.

Schedule

Season summary

Southwestern Louisiana
The season opened with a 79–0 victory over Southwestern Louisiana. One full quarter was played by the substitutes.

Mississippi College
The Mississippi College Choctaws and Goat Hale fell to Tulane 29–0.

Rice

Sources:

The Rice Owls fought Tulane to a scoreless tie in a game shifted to Heinemann Park.

On Oct. 20, 1920, Earl Sparling, the editor of the Tulane Hullabaloo, wrote a football song which was printed in the newspaper. The song was titled "The Rolling Green Wave." Although the name was not immediately adopted, it began to receive acceptance.

Mississippi
Tulane beat Mississippi  32–0. Coach Shaughnessy introduced a new shift in the first half, and the players had trouble implementing it. By the second period, Tulane played conventional football instead.

Michigan
The season's first loss was 21–0 to the Michigan Wolverines in Ann Arbor, succumbing to the northern foes by the second half.

Florida

Sources:

In Tampa, Tulane beat the Florida Gators 14–0. Florida's Tootie Perry played one of the best games seen in Tampa. Dwyer went over right tackle for the first touchdown. After B. Brown cut loose for a 30-yard run, Richcoon scored the last.

The starting lineup was Beaulau (left end), Unsworth (left tackle), Fitz (left guard), Reed (center), Killinger (right guard), Payne (right tackle), Wight (right end), Richeson (quarterback), Dwyer (left halfback), Brown (right halfback), McGraw (fullback).

Mississippi A&M

Sources:

In what the yearbook called "the critical game of the season," Tulane won 6–0 over the Mississippi Aggies. Both teams were previously unbeaten. The feature of the contest twas Johnny Wight's punt returns, which set up the game's only score.

The starting lineup was Weigan (left end), Payne (left tackle), Fit (left guard), Reed (Center),  Bellieu (left guard), Palermo (right tackle), Wight (right end), Richeson (quarterback), Dwyer (left halfback), Brown (right halfback), Smith (fullback).

LSU
Tulane triumphed 21–0 over rival LSU. The starting lineup was Wiegand (left end), Payne (left tackle), Fitz (left guard), Reed (center), Unsworth (right guard), Beallieu (right tackle), Wight (right end), Richeson (quarterback), Dwyer (left halfback), Brown (right halfback), Smith (fullback).

Detroit

Sources:

On a muddy field, the Detroit Titans beat Tulane 7–0. Detroit opened up with passes early, leading to Lauer's off tackle touchdown. The starting lineup was Smith (left end), Payne (left tackle), Unsworth (left guard), Reed (center), Palermo (right guard), Fitz (right tackle), Wight (right end), Richeson (quarterback), Brown (left halfback), Dwyer (right halfback), Beaullieu (fullback).

Players

Line

Backfield

References

Additional sources
 

Tulane
Tulane Green Wave football seasons
Tulane Green Wave football